Berreman Township is one of twenty-three townships in Jo Daviess County, Illinois, USA.  As of the 2010 census, its population was 147 and it contained 73 housing units.  It was formed from Pleasant Valley Township on February 14, 1857.

Geography

Cemeteries
The township contains Clay Cemetery.

Demographics

School districts
 Pearl City Community Unit School District 200.
 Stockton Community Unit School District 206.
 West Carroll Community Unit School District 314.

Political districts
 Illinois' 16th congressional district.
 State House District 89.
 State Senate District 45.

References
 
 United States Census Bureau 2007 TIGER/Line Shapefiles.
 United States National Atlas.

External links
 Jo Daviess County official site.
 City-Data.com.
 Illinois State Archives.
 Township Officials of Illinois.

Townships in Jo Daviess County, Illinois
Townships in Illinois
1857 establishments in Illinois
Populated places established in 1857